Hillsboro is a city in Henry County, Iowa, United States. The population was 163 at the time of the 2020 census.

History
Hillsboro (or Hillsborough) was originally called Washington, but the name was changed when it was discovered there was already a community called Washington in Iowa. Hillsboro was laid out in 1840.

Geography
Hillsboro is located at  (40.836270, -91.713613).

Demographics

2010 census
At the 2010 census there were 180 people in 80 households, including 50 families, in the city. The racial makup of the city was 98.9% White, 0.6% African American, and 0.6% from two or more races. Hispanic or Latino of any race were 3.3%.

Of the 80 households 27.5% had children under the age of 18 living with them, 45.0% were married couples living together, 8.8% had a female householder with no husband present, 8.8% had a male householder with no wife present, and 37.5% were non-families. 33.8% of households were one person and 12.6% were one person aged 65 or older. The average household size was 2.25 and the average family size was 2.80.

The median age was 46.5 years. 23.9% of residents were under the age of 18; 6.7% were between the ages of 18 and 24; 16.7% were from 25 to 44; 31% were from 45 to 64; and 21.7% were 65 or older. The gender makeup of the city was 51.7% male and 48.3% female.

2000 census
At the 2000 census there were 205 people in 81 households, including 54 families, in the city. The racial makup of the city was 99.02% White, and 0.98% from two or more races. Hispanic or Latino of any race were 0.98%.

Of the 81 households 34.6% had children under the age of 18 living with them, 53.1% were married couples living together, 11.1% had a female householder with no husband present, and 32.1% were non-families. 28.4% of households were one person and 14.8% were one person aged 65 or older. The average household size was 2.53 and the average family size was 3.04.

The age distribution was 28.8% under the age of 18, 7.3% from 18 to 24, 26.8% from 25 to 44, 24.4% from 45 to 64, and 12.7% 65 or older. The median age was 37 years. For every 100 females, there were 86.4 males. For every 100 females age 18 and over, there were 87.2 males.

The median household income was $35,500 and the median family income  was $36,563. Males had a median income of $30,000 versus $20,000 for females. The per capita income for the city was $11,985. About 13.6% of families and 21.8% of the population were below the poverty line, including 31.7% of those under the age of eighteen and 17.9% of those sixty five or over.

Education
The community is served by the Van Buren County Community School District. It was previously in the Harmony Community School District, until it merged into Van Buren County CSD on July 1, 2019.

Notable person

John Whitaker, former Iowa State representative.

References

Cities in Iowa
Cities in Henry County, Iowa
1840 establishments in Iowa Territory